Pasch is a German and Swedish surname. Notable people with the surname include:

Dave Pasch, sports broadcaster
Erich Pasch, German sprint canoeist
Gustaf Erik Pasch, Swedish inventor
Johan Pasch, Swedish painter
Lorens Pasch the Younger (1733–1805), Swedish painter
Lorens Pasch the Elder (1702–1766), Swedish painter
Moritz Pasch (1843–1930), German mathematician
Sandy Pasch, American politician
Ulrika Pasch (1735–1796), Swedish painter and miniaturist

See also
Basch
Pascha (disambiguation)
Pasch's theorem
Passover